Huddersfield Town's 1917–18 campaign saw Town continuing to play in the wartime football league. Town played in the Midland League and finished in 8th place, as well as 7th place in the Subsidiary Competition.

Results

Midland Division

Subsidiary Competition

References 

Huddersfield Town A.F.C. seasons
Huddersfield Town F.C.